Qubalı (also, Kubaly) is a village and municipality in the Hajigabul Rayon of Azerbaijan.  It has a population of 430.

References 

Populated places in Hajigabul District